Eden Township may refer to:

California 
Eden Township, Alameda County, California, a former township

Kansas 
 Either of two townships in Kansas

Illinois 
 Eden Township, LaSalle County, Illinois

Indiana 
 Eden Township, LaGrange County, Indiana

Iowa
 Eden Township, Benton County, Iowa
 Eden Township, Carroll County, Iowa
 Eden Township, Clinton County, Iowa
 Eden Township, Decatur County, Iowa
 Eden Township, Fayette County, Iowa
 Eden Township, Marshall County, Iowa
 Eden Township, Winnebago County, Iowa

Michigan
 Eden Township, Lake County, Michigan
 Eden Township, Mason County, Michigan

Minnesota
 Eden Township, Brown County, Minnesota
 Eden Township, Pipestone County, Minnesota
 Eden Township, Polk County, Minnesota

Nebraska 
 Eden Township, Antelope County, Nebraska

North Dakota 
 Eden Township, Walsh County, North Dakota

Ohio
 Eden Township, Licking County, Ohio
 Eden Township, Seneca County, Ohio
 Eden Township, Wyandot County, Ohio

Pennsylvania 
 Eden Township, Lancaster County, Pennsylvania

South Dakota 
 Any of several townships in South Dakota

Township name disambiguation pages